USNS Walter S. Diehl (T-AO-193) is a  of the United States Navy. She was named after Captain Walter Stuart Diehl, USN, a career naval officer and aeronautical engineer.

Design
The Henry J. Kaiser-class replenishment oilers were preceded by the shorter s.

They were initially built without armaments, but are equipped with small arms and can be fitted with close-in weapon systems if required. The ship has a helicopter platform but not any maintenance facilities. She has a complement of 89 civilians (nineteen officers), 29 spare crew, and 6 United States Navy crew.

Construction and delivery
Walter S. Diehl, the seventh ship of the Henry J. Kaiser-class, was laid down at Avondale Shipyard, Inc., at New Orleans, Louisiana, on 7 August 1986 and launched on 2 October 1987. She entered non-commissioned U.S. Navy service under the control of the Military Sealift Command with a primarily civilian crew on 13 September 1988.

Service history
Walter S. Diehl was assigned to the United States Pacific Fleet, serving in the Pacific Ocean, Indian Ocean, and Persian Gulf regions.

On 23 April 2002, Walter S. Diehl was passing through the Strait of Hormuz when six small motorboats sped alongside in an aggressive and threatening manner. Walter S. Diehl fired flares to warn the boats off, but they did not move away. She then opened fire with a .50-caliber (12.7-mm) machine gun and the boats sped off.

On 20 November 2014, Walter S. Diehl collided with the  during an underway replenishment operation. No injuries were reported. 

She was taken out of service and placed in reserve on 1 October 2022.

References

External links

 NavSource Online: Service Ship Photo Archive: USNS Walter S. Diehl (T-AO-193)
 USNS Walter S. Diehl (T-AO 193)

 

Henry J. Kaiser-class oilers
Cold War auxiliary ships of the United States
Ships built in Bridge City, Louisiana
1987 ships